Kristof Hering (born 27 February 1989) is a German singer, best known for finishing in sixth place in season 9 of Deutschland sucht den Superstar.

Early life

Hering was born in Hanover, West Germany. He has an older sister and younger brother. In 2008, he left home and went to a Catholic Gymnasium where he received his Abitur. He was at the Stage-School-Hamburg in 2008 and 2009. 

He is a fan of Udo Jürgens, Robbie Williams and Peter Maffay. He also likes jazz and pop. His favorite songs includes "Über 7 Brücken" by Peter Maffay and "I sing a Liad für di" by Andreas Gabalier.

Career

DSDS

Hering was eliminated in the top 6 of Deutschland sucht den Superstar. He suffered verbal abuse and death threats during his participation during season 9 due to his homosexuality. People were writing stuff like "You are sooo gay to .."; "I'll cut your balls"; "Get out of DSDS, if you value your life" and "I stab you up". Broadcaster RTL filed charges against unknown persons because of the threats.

Performances

Post-DSDS

After DSDS, Hering released a single called "Tears of Happiness".

References

1989 births
Musicians from Hanover
Deutschland sucht den Superstar participants
German LGBT singers
21st-century German male singers
Living people
Mass media people from Lower Saxony